Ares Vallis  is an outflow channel on Mars, named after the Greek  name for Mars: Ares,  the god of war; it appears to have been carved by fluids, perhaps water. It then continues through the ancient Xanthe Terra highlands, and ends in a delta-like region of Chryse Planitia. Ares Vallis was the landing site of NASA's Mars Pathfinder spacecraft, which studied a region of the valley near the border with Chryse in 1997.
 
Ares Vallis is in the Oxia Palus quadrangle of Mars.

It has been argued that Uzboi, Ladon, Margaritifer and Ares valles, although now separated by large craters, once comprised a single outflow channel, flowing north into Chryse Planitia. The source of this outflow has been suggested as overflow from the Argyre Crater, formerly filled to the brim as a lake by channels (Surius, Dzigai, and Palacopus Valles) draining down from the south pole. Under this suggestion, the extant form of the outflow channel Ares Vallis would thus be a remolding of a pre-existing structure. This long path for water flow has been named the * Uzboi-Landon-Morava (ULM) system. Water from this system may have helped to form Ares Vallis.

Although earlier research showed that Mars had a warm and wet early history that has long since dried up, these lakes existed in the Hesperian Epoch, a much earlier period. Using detailed images from NASA's Mars Reconnaissance Orbiter, the researchers speculate that there may have been increased volcanic activity, meteorite impacts or shifts in Mars' orbit during this period to warm Mars' atmosphere enough to melt the abundant ice present in the ground. Volcanoes would have released gases that thickened the atmosphere for a temporary period, trapping more sunlight and making it warm enough for liquid water to exist. In this new study, channels were discovered that connected lake basins near Ares Vallis. When one lake filled up, its waters overflowed the banks and carved the channels to a lower area where another lake would form. These lakes would be another place to look for evidence of present or past life.

See also 

 Chaos terrain
 Geology of Mars
 HiRISE
 Lakes on Mars
 List of areas of chaos terrain on Mars
 Martian chaos terrain
 Outburst flood
 Mars Pathfinder
 Outflow channels
 Uzboi-Landon-Morava (ULM)

References

Further reading

External links 

 Google Mars scrollable map - centered on Ares Vallis.

Valleys and canyons on Mars
Oxia Palus quadrangle